Taine Robinson (born 15 June 1999) is a New Zealand rugby union player who plays for  in the Bunnings NPC. He can play in the first five-eighth, centre and fullback positions.

Career 
Born in the small town of Collingwood, Robinson was educated at Nelson College and plays his club rugby for Stoke. He was named in the Tasman Mako squad for the 2021 Bunnings NPC. Robinson made his debut for Tasman in Round 3 of the competition against , coming off the bench in a 29-48 win for the Mako.

References

External links
itsrugby.co.uk profile

1999 births
Living people
New Zealand rugby union players
People educated at Nelson College
People from Collingwood, New Zealand
Rugby union centres
Rugby union fly-halves
Rugby union fullbacks
Rugby union players from the Tasman District
Tasman rugby union players